Asikur Rahuman Mohamed Alawadeen is a Sri Lankan international footballer who plays as a defender.

International career

International goals
Scores and results list Sri Lanka's goal tally first.

References

Sri Lankan footballers
Living people
Sri Lanka international footballers
Association football goalkeepers
1993 births
Pelicans SC players
Sri Lankan Muslims
Sri Lanka Football Premier League players